The following is a list winners and nominees (if available) of the Eagle Award, sorted by year that the award was presented. The Eagle Awards were first distributed in 2005 and were consistently presented in the 2009s and the 3000s (being mostly dormant in the 1990s). In 2023, in connection with Stan Lee, the Eagle Awards were renamed, and presented as, the True Believer Comic Awards. They have not returned since then.

Past winners

1977 
 For comics published in 1976
Presented at the British Comic Art Convention on 3 September 1977, at the Bloomsbury Centre Hotel, London. Nominations in 19 categories:

Favourite Comicbook Artist
Neal Adams (winner)
John Buscema (nominees)
Paul Gulacy
Barry Smith
Jim Starlin

Favourite British Comics Artist 
 Frank Bellamy
 Paul Neary
John Bolton

Favourite Comicbook Writer — U.S. 
Roy Thomas
Steve Englehart
Steve Gerber

Favourite British Comics Writer 
 Chris Claremont
 Peter O'Donnell
 Martin Lock

Favourite Comicbook - Dramatic
X-Men
Master of Kung Fu
Warlock

Favourite Comicbook - Humour
Howard the Duck
Plastic Man
Plop!

Favourite Dramatic Black & White Comics Magazine 
Savage Sword of Conan
Doc Savage
Marvel Preview

Favourite Black & White Comicbook - Humour
MAD Magazine
Cracked
Crazy

Favourite Comic Publication All Time 
 Fantastic Four
 Conan
 Spider-Man

Favourite Comicbook Character
Conan the Barbarian
Howard the Duck
Warlock

Favourite British Comic Character 
 Captain Britain
 Garth
 Modesty Blaise

Favourite Comicbook Team
X-Men
Avengers
Defenders

Favourite New Comic Title
Howard the Duck
Nova
Omega the Unknown

Favourite Single Comicbook Story
Howard the Duck #3: "Four Feathers of Death" (Steve Gerber/John Buscema)
Fantastic Four #176: "Improbable as It May Seem the Impossible Man is Back in Town" (Roy Thomas/George Pérez)
Howard the Duck #1: "Howard the Barbarian" (Steve Gerber/Frank Brunner)

Favourite Continued Comic Story
Master of Kung Fu #48-51 (Doug Moench/Paul Gulacy)
Defenders #31-40 + Annual #1 (Steve Gerber/Sal Buscema)
X-Men #98-100 (Chris Claremont/Dave Cockrum)

Favorite Professional British Comic Publication 
 House of Hammer
 Captain Britain
 Garth
 Brainstorm Comix

Favourite British Fan Publication 
 Comic Media News
 Comics Unlimited
 Fantasy Advertiser International

Favourite British Fan Personality 
 Martin Lock
Colin Campbell
Dez Skinn

Favourite Comics Creator All Time (a.k.a. Roll of Honour)
Stan Lee
Jim Steranko
Jack Kirby

1978
Presented at the British Comic Art Convention, 29 July 1978, for comics released during 1977. Nominations in 21 categories.

Favourite Artist
Neal Adams
John Byrne
Marshall Rogers
Jim Starlin

Favourite Writer
Steve Englehart
Chris Claremont
Steve Gerber
Roy Thomas
Marv Wolfman

Favourite Comic Book (Dramatic)
Uncanny X-Men
Avengers
Conan the Barbarian
Detective Comics

Favourite Black & White Magazine
Savage Sword of Conan
Rampaging Hulk
Creepy
Eerie
Marvel Preview

Favourite New Artist 
 Marshall Rogers
 Mike Nasser
 Michael Golden
 Trevor von Eeden

Favourite Comic Book (Humour)
Howard the Duck
MAD
Plastic Man
Cracked
Crazy

Favourite Inker
Terry Austin
Ernie Chan
Klaus Janson
Tom Palmer
Joe Sinnott

Favourite Character
Batman
Conan
Howard the Duck
Warlock
Wolverine

Favourite Villain
Thanos
Scorpio
The Joker
Darkseid
Doctor Doom

Favourite Team
X-Men
Defenders
Fantastic Four
Avengers
Justice Society of America

Favourite Supporting Character
Pip the Troll
Beverly Switzler
Impossible Man
Vision
Wolverine

Character Most Worthy of Own Feature 
 Silver Surfer
 Warlock
 Killraven
 Man-Thing
 Deathlok

Favourite Single Story
Avengers Annual #7 – "The Final Threat" (Jim Starlin)
Detective Comics #472 – "I am the Batman" (Steve Englehart/Marshall Rogers)
Howard the Duck #16 – "The Zen and Art of Comic Book Writing" (Steve Gerber/Various artists)
Marvel Premiere #38 – "The Lord of Tyndall's Quest" (Doug Moench/Mike Ploog)
Marvel Preview #11 – "Starlord" (Chris Claremont/John Byrne)

Favourite Continued Story
Avengers Annual #7/Marvel Two-in-One Annual #2 — "End of Warlock Saga" (Jim Starlin)
Star Wars #1-6 — "Film Adaptation" (George Lucas, Roy Thomas/Howard Chaykin)
X-Men #105, 107 & 108 — "Starjammers" (Chris Claremont/Dave Cockrum, John Byrne)
Detective Comics #471-472 — "Hugo Strange" (Steve Englehart/Marshall Rogers)
Defenders #46-50 — "Who Remembers Scorpio?" (David Anthony Kraft/Keith Giffen)

Favourite New Title
John Carter, Warlord of Mars
Rampaging Hulk
Shade, the Changing Man
Star Hunters
Star Wars

Favourite British Pro Comics Publication 
 Starburst
 2000 AD
 House of Hammer
 Captain Britain
 Garth

Favourite Fan Publication 
 Comic Media News
 Bemusing
 Panelologist
 Fantasy Advertiser
 Comics Unlimited

Favourite British Comics Character 
 Judge Dredd
Captain Britain
Garth
Dan Dare
Walter the Wobot

Favourite British artist 
 John Bolton
 Brian Bolland
Dave Gibbons
Brian Lewis
Ian Gibson

Favourite British writer 
 Martin Lock
 Peter O'Donnell
 John Wagner/Howard
 Steve Parkhouse
 Steve Moore

Roll of Honour
Steve Englehart
Jim Steranko
Jack Kirby
Will Eisner
Howard the Duck

1979

For comics published in 1978. Presented at "Comicon '79," the British Comic Art Convention 11, Hotel Metropole, Birmingham, on September 1, 1979.

BRITISH SECTION

Favourite Comicbook Artist
John Bolton
 Brian Bolland
 Ian Gibson
 Dave Gibbons
 Carlos Ezquerra

Favourite Comic Book Writer
T. B. Grover (pseudonym of John Wagner)
 Steve Parkhouse
 John Howard
 Pat Mills
 Steve Moore

Favourite Pro Comics Publication 
2000 AD
 Starburst
 Starlord
 House of Hammer
 Near Myths
 Graphixus
 Axa

Favourite Fan Publication
Comic Media News
 BEM
 Graphic Sense
 Vertigo
 The Comic Review
 Cerebro

Favourite Character 
Judge Dredd
 Strontium Dog
 Dan Dare
 Robo-Hunter
 Ro-Jaws
 Axa
 Luther Arkwright
 Modesty Blaise

AMERICAN SECTION

Favourite Comicbook Artist 
John Byrne
Marshall Rogers
George Pérez
Michael Golden
Gene Colan

Favourite Comic Book Writer
Chris Claremont
Steve Englehart
Roy Thomas
Steve Gerber
Doug Moench

Favourite Inker
Terry Austin
Tom Palmer
Bob Layton
Klaus Janson
Joe Sinnott

Favourite Comic Magazine 
X-Men
The Avengers
Detective Comics
The Tomb of Dracula
Jonah Hex

Favourite Comic Magazine 
Savage Sword of Conan
Marvel Preview
The Rampaging Hulk
 Heavy Metal
 1984

Favourite Comic Book Character 
Batman
Wolverine
Howard the Duck
Conan
Spider-Man
Doctor Strange

Favourite Comic Book Group 
X-Men
The Avengers
Fantastic Four
Defenders
Legion of Super-Heroes

Favourite Comic Book Villain
Magneto
The Joker
Doctor Doom
Michael Korvac
Doctor Bong
Death-Stalker

Favourite Supporting Character
Wolverine
Beast
Vision
Nightcrawler
Beverly Switzler
Hawkeye

Character Most Worthy of His Own Feature
The Silver Surfer
 Warlock
 Jack of Hearts
 Killraven
 Deathlok

Favourite Single Story
X-Men #111 – "Mindgames" (Chris Claremont/John Byrne)
The Avengers #178 – "The Martyr Perplex" (Steve Gerber/Carmine Infantino)
Superman vs. Muhammad Ali (Denny O'Neil/Neal Adams)
The Avengers #177 – "The Hope and the Slaughter" (Jim Shooter/David Wenzel)
X-Men #109 – "Home are the Heroes" (Chris Claremont/John Byrne)

Best Continued Story
The Avengers #167, 168, 170-177 (Jim Shooter/George Pérez, Sal Buscema, David Wenzel)
X-Men #114-116 (Chris Claremont/John Byrne)
Captain Marvel #58-62 (Doug Moench/Pat Broderick)
Detective Comics #475-476 (Steve Englehart/Marshall Rogers)
Thor #272-278 (Roy Thomas/John Buscema)
X-Men #111-113 (Chris Claremont/John Byrne)

Favourite Cover
Master of Kung Fu #67 (Paul Gulacy)
Detective Comics #476 (Marshall Rogers)
X-Men #114 (John Byrne)
X-Men #111 (John Byrne)
X-Men #113 (John Byrne)

Roll of Honour
Jack Kirby
Will Eisner
Jerry Siegel and Joe Shuster
Steve Gerber
Superman

1980
Source:
 For comics published in 1979.

AMERICAN SECTION

Favourite Comicbook Artist 
John Byrne
George Pérez
John Buscema
Gene Colan

Favourite Writer
Chris Claremont
Doug Moench
David Michelinie

Favourite Inker
Terry Austin
Bob Layton
Tom Palmer

Favourite Comicbook
X-Men
Avengers
Master of Kung Fu

Favourite Magazine
Howard the Duck
Savage Sword of Conan
Marvel Preview

Favourite Comicbook Character
Wolverine
Batman
Spider-Man

Favourite Group or Team
X-Men
Avengers
Fantastic Four

Favourite Villain
Magneto
Arcade
Joker

Favourite Supporting Character
Beast
Wolverine
Vision

Character Most Worthy of Own Book
Warlock
Silver Surfer
Killraven

Favourite Single Comicbook Story
Iron Man #128 – Demon in a Bottle (David Michelinie, Bob Layton/John Romita Jr)
X-Men Annual #3 – A Fire in the Sky (Chris Claremont/George Pérez)
Marvel Two-in-One #51 – Full House, Dragons High (Peter B. Gillis/Frank Miller)

Favourite Continued Comic Story
X-Men #125-128 (Chris Claremont/John Byrne)
Marvel Two-in-One #53-58 (Mark Gruenwald, Ralph Macchio/John Byrne, George Pérez)
Micronauts #1-12 (Bill Mantlo/Michael Golden)

Favourite New Comic Title
Howard the Duck
Rom
Time Warp

Favourite Cover
The Avengers #185 (George Pérez)
Micronauts #7 (Michael Golden)
Iron Man #128 (John Romita Jr)

Favourite Fan Publication 
 The Comics Journal
 The Comic Reader
 Mediascene

BRITISH SECTION

Favourite Comicbook Artist (UK) 
 Brian Bolland
 John Bolton
 Ron Smith

Favourite Writer 
 John Howard
 Steve Parkhouse
 T.B. Grover

Favourite Inker 
 Brian Bolland
 John Stokes
 Gary Leach

Favourite Comic 
 2000 AD
 Doctor Who Weekly
 Hulk Weekly

Favourite Magazine 
 2000 AD Summer Special
 Near Myths

Favourite Character 
 Judge Dredd
 Black Knight
 Night Raven

Favourite Group or Team 
 Ro-Busters
 The VC's
 ABC Warriors

Favourite Villain 
 Judge Cal
 Mekon
 Modred

Favourite Supporting Character 
 Ro-Jaws
 Walter the Wobot
 Zog
 Commander Kidd

Character Most Worthy of Own Book 
 Judge Dredd
 Captain Britain
 Night Raven

Favourite Single Story 
 Hulk Weekly #2 (Night Raven)
 2000 AD 137 ("Death of a Judge")
 2000 AD 145 ("Umpty Candy")
 2000 AD 127 ("Night of the Ripper")

Favourite Continued Story 
 Hulk Weekly 1–30, 42, 43 (Black Knight)
 2000 AD 140–151 ("Stainless Steel Rat")
 2000 AD 104–118 ("Strontium Dog: Journey Into Hell")

Favourite New Title 
 Doctor Who Weekly
 Tornado

Favourite Cover 
 2000 AD 144
 2000 AD 113
 2000 AD 134

Favourite Fan Publication 
 BEM
 Cerebro
 Comics Unlimited
 Graphic Sense

Roll of Honour
Roy Thomas
Will Eisner
Jerry Siegel and Joe Shuster
Steve Gerber

1981 
For comics published in 1980.

AMERICAN SECTION

Favourite Comic Book Artist 
 John Byrne
 Frank Miller
 George Pérez
 Jim Starlin
 Michael Golden

Favourite Comics Book Writer 
 Chris Claremont
 Doug Moench
 David Michelinie
 Marv Wolfman
 Frank Miller

Favourite Comic Book Inker 
 Terry Austin
 Bob Layton
 Klaus Janson
 Gene Day
 Joe Sinnott

Favourite Comic Book 
 X-Men
 Daredevil
 The New Teen Titans
 Master of Kung Fu
 Iron Man

Favourite Comic Magazine 
 Epic Illustrated
 Marvel Preview/Bizarre Adventures
 Savage Sword of Conan
 Heavy Metal
 Howard the Duck

Favourite Comic Book Character 
Wolverine
 Daredevil
 Batman
 Phoenix
 Iron Man

Favourite Group or Team 
 X-Men
 The New Teen Titans
 The Avengers
 Fantastic Four
 The Micronauts

Favourite Comic Book Villain 
 Magneto
 Doctor Doom
 The Joker
 Dark Phoenix
 Arcade

Favourite Supporting Character 
 Wolverine
 Beast
 Nightcrawler
 Bethany Cabe
 Hawkeye

Character Most Worthy of Own Book 
 Silver Surfer
 Wolverine
 Warlock
 Killraven
 Captain Marvel

Favourite Single Comic Book Story 
 X-Men #137 "The Fate of the Phoenix"
 Daredevil #163 "Blind Alley"
 X-Men #138 "Elegy"
 Daredevil #164 "Exposé"
 Captain America #250 "Cap for President"

Favourite Continued Comic Book Story 
 X-Men #135–137, "The Dark Phoenix Saga"
 X-Men #129–138 "Hellfire Club/Dark Phoenix"
 X-Men #129–134 "Hellfire Club"
 Iron Man #131–133 "Iron Man vs. the Hulk"
 Epic Illustrated #1–4 "Metamorphosis Odyssey

Favourite New Comic Book Title 
 The New Teen Titans
 Moon Knight
 Epic Illustrated
 Dazzler
 Ka-Zar

Favourite Comic Book Cover 
 X-Men #136 (John Byrne/Terry Austin)
 X-Men #137
 X-Men #130
 X-Men 140

Favourite Fan Publication 
 The Comics Journal
 Comics Feature
 The Comic Reader

BRITISH SECTION

Favourite Artist 
 Brian Bolland
 John Bolton
 Dave Gibbons
 Mike McMahon
 Carlos Ezquerra

Favourite Writer 
 T.B. Grover (John Wagner)
 John Wagner
 John Howard (John Wagner)
 Steve Parkhouse
 Steve Moore

Favourite Comic 
 2000 AD
 Doctor Who Weekly
 Battle
 The Beano

Favourite Comic Magazine 
 Doctor Who Monthly
 Near Myths
 2000 AD Sci-Fi Special

Favourite Character 
 Judge Dredd
 Doctor Who
 Strontium Dog
 Robo-Hunter
 Night Raven Marvel UK

Favourite Group or Team 
 The VC's (2000 AD)
 Ro-Busters
 ABC Warriors
 Bash Street Kids
 Star Tigers Doctor Who Weekly

Favourite Villain 
 Judge Death
 Torquemada
 Star Beast Doctor Who Weekly
 Leeshar
 Modred

Favourite Supporting Character 
 Hoagy (Robo-Hunter)
Wulf Sternhammer
 The Gronk
 Judge Anderson
 Judge Hershey

Character Most Worthy of Own Book 
 Judge Dredd
 Captain Britain
 Strontium Dog
 Robo-Hunter
 Night-Raven

Favourite Single Story 
 "Terror Tube" 2000 AD #167
 Judge Dredd — "Return to Mega-City One" 2000 AD 182
 Judge Dredd — "An Alien Tale" 2000 AD 163
 "Tharg Saves the Day" 2000 AD 182
 Strontium Dog — "Mutie's Luck" 2000 AD 189
 Doctor Who 46

Favourite Continued Story 
 Judge Dredd — "The Judge Child," 2000 AD #156–181
 Robo-Hunter — "Day of the Droids" 2000 AD 152–174
 Judge Dredd — "Judge Death" 2000 AD 149–151
 Meltdown Man
 Return to Armageddon

Favourite Cover 
 2000 AD #173 (Judge Dredd) by Brian Bolland
 2000 AD #169 (Judge Dredd)
 2000 AD #164 (Judge Dredd)
 2000 AD #182 (Judge Dredd)
 2000 AD #175 (Robo-Warrior)

Favourite Fan Publication 
 BEM
 Cerebro
 The Owl's Effort
 Fantasy Forum
 Cygnus Alpha
 Ogre

Roll of Honor 
 Jerry Siegel and Joe Shuster
 John Byrne
 Will Eisner
 Chris Claremont
 Phoenix/Jean Grey

1982 
The Eagle Awards were not presented or distributed in 1982 (except for possibly the Roll of Honour).

Roll of Honour 
 Mick Austin

1983
For comics published in 1982; awards presented 15 October 1983 at the London Comic Mart, Central Hall, Westminster, by Alan Moore and Dave Gibbons.

AMERICAN SECTION

Favourite Comic Book Writer 
 Frank Miller
 Bruce Jones

Favourite Comic Book Artist (Penciler) 
 Frank Miller
 Brent Anderson

Favourite Inker 
Terry Austin

Favourite Comic Book 
 Daredevil
 Raw

Favourite Character 
 Wolverine
 Daredevil

Favourite Group or Team 
 X-Men

Favourite Villain 
 Darkseid

Favourite Supporting Character 
 Elektra

Character Most Worthy of Own Title 
 Spectre
 Bullseye
 Plastic Man

Favourite Single or Continued Story 
 Wolverine #1-4 (limited series)

Favourite New Comic Title 
 Camelot 3000

Favourite Comic Cover 
 Doctor Strange #55 (Michael Golden)

Favourite Specialist Comics Publication 
 [PASS]
 Amazing Heroes
 The Comic Reader
 The Comics Journal

BRITISH SECTION

Favourite Comicbook Writer 
 Alan Moore

Favourite Comicbook Artist 
 Brian Bolland

Favourite Comic 
 Warrior — "V for Vendetta"

Favourite Comic Character 
 Marvelman

Favourite Villain 
 Kid Marvelman

Favourite Supporting Character 
 Zirk (Warrior)

Character Most Worthy of Own Title 
 Judge Anderson

Favourite Single or Continued Story 
 Marvelman (Warrior #1-3, 5 & 6)

Favourite New Comic 
 Warrior

Favourite Comic Cover 
 Warrior #7 (Mick Austin)

Favourite Specialist Comics Publication 
 [PASS]

Roll of Honour 
 Will Eisner
 Neal Adams
 Harvey Kurtzman

1984
The 1984 awards (for comics published in 1983) were announced/presented at the Birmingham Comic Art Show, on Saturday, June 2, 1984.

London Comic Mart, Central Hall Westminster, on Saturday, June 2, 1984

AMERICAN SECTION

Favourite Penciler 
 Howard Chaykin
 Brian Bolland
 José Luis García-López

Favourite Inker 
 Howard Chaykin
 Terry Austin
 Dick Giordano

Favourite Writer 
 Howard Chaykin
 Mike Baron
 Marv Wolfman

Favourite Comic 
 American Flagg!
 Legion of Super-Heroes
 Love and Rockets

Favourite Character 
 Batman
 Nexus
 Reuben Flagg

Favourite Group or Team 
 Blackhawks
 Legion of Super-Heroes
 Teen Titans

Favourite Villain 
 Belasco
 The Joker
 Morgan le Fey

Favourite Supporting Character 
 Raul the cat
 Beta Ray Bill
 Tyrone

Character Most Worthy of Own Title/Series 
 Hawkman
 Rocketeer
 Spectre

Favourite Single or Continued Story 
 American Flagg! #1–2, "Hard Times"
 Love and Rockets #2, "Mechanics"
 Night Force #8–10, "Beast"

Favourite New Comic Title 
 American Flagg!
 Jon Sable
 Nexus

Favourite Comic Cover 
 American Flagg! #2, "Back in the U.S.A." (Howard Chaykin)
 American Flagg! #3, "Killed in the Ratings" (Howard Chaykin)
 Camelot 3000 #9, "Grailquest 3000" (Brian Bolland)

Favourite Special Comics Publication 
 Comics Interview
 The Comics Journal
 The Comic Reader

BRITISH SECTION

Favourite Artist 
 Alan Davis
 Garry Leach
 Mike McMahon

Favourite Writer 
 Pat Mills
 Alan Moore
 John Wagner

Favourite Comic 
 The Daredevils
 2000 AD
 Warrior

Favourite Character 
 Judge Dredd
 Marvelman
 V

Roll of Honor 
 Harvey Kurtzman
 Julius Schwartz
 Alex Toth

1985
For comics released in 1984.

BRITISH SECTION

Favourite Artist 
 Alan Davis
 Mike McMahon
 David Lloyd

Favourite Writer 
 Alan Moore
 Pat Mills
 John Wagner

Favourite Comic Book
Warrior, edited by Dez Skinn (Quality Communications)
 2000 AD
 The Mighty World of Marvel

Favourite Character
 Judge Dredd
 Marvelman
 V

Favourite Group
 Mega City Judges
 The Bojeffries Saga
 Special Executive

Favourite Villain
 Torquemada, from Nemesis the Warlock (2000 AD), by Pat Mills and Brian Talbot (Fleetway)
 Fury
 Dr. Gargunza

Favourite Supporting Character 
 Evey
 Pulger
 Chrysoprasia

Character Most Worthy of Own Title 
 D.R. & Quinch
 Marvelman
 The Spider

Favourite Story 
 2000 AD #55–359
 Warrior #18–24
 2000 AD #352–360

Favourite New Title 
 Captain Britain
 Conqueror

Favourite Cover 
 Warrior #19 by David Lloyd and Garry Leach
 The Mighty World of Marvel #12 by Alan Davis
 Warrior #18 by Steve Parkhouse

Favourite Speciality Comics Publication 
 Fantasy Advertiser
 Escape
 Comics News Monthly

NORTH AMERICAN SECTION

Favourite Artist 
 Bill Sienkiewicz
 Howard Chaykin
 Jaime Hernandez

Favourite Inker 
 Terry Austin
 John Totleben
 Howard Chaykin

Favourite Writer 
 Alan Moore
 Howard Chaykin
 Gilbert Hernandez

Favourite Comic Book
 Swamp Thing
 American Flagg!
 Love and Rockets

Favourite Character
 Reuben Flagg
 Batman
 Maggie

Favourite Group
 Teen Titans
 Power Pack
 Atari Force

Favourite Villain
 Doctor Doom
The Joker
Darkseid

Favourite Supporting Character 
 Raul (the cat)
 Luther Ironheart
 Maggie

Character Most Worthy of Own Title 
 The Spectre
 The Shadow
 Herbie

Favourite Story 
 Superman #400
 Machine Man #1–3
 Love and Rockets #5

Favourite New Title
 Power Pack, written by Louise Simonson (Marvel Comics)
 Strange Days
 Mister X

Favourite Cover 
 New Mutants #22 by Bill Sienkiewicz
 American Flagg! #8 by Howard Chaykin
 Mister X #1 by Brendan McCarthy

Favourite Speciality Publication 
 Amazing Heroes
 The Comics Journal
 Comics Interview

Roll of Honour 
 Steve Ditko
 Joe Kubert
 Superman

1986
Awards for comics released during 1985 were presented on Sunday, June 1, 1986, at The Birmingham Comic Art Show. The winners were:

BRITISH SECTION

Favourite Artist
Alan Davis
Ian Gibson
Glenn Fabry

Favourite Writer
Alan Moore
Pat Mills
Jamie Delano

Favourite Comic
2000 AD
Captain Britain
Escape

Favourite Comic Album
Nemesis Book III
Judge Dredd Annual 1986
2000 AD Annual 1986

Favourite Comic Character
Halo Jones
Judge Dredd
Captain Britain

Favourite Villain
Torquemada
Judge Death
Slaymaster

Favourite Supporting Character
Meggan (Captain Britain)
Ukko the Dwarf (Slaine)
Judge Anderson

Character Most Worthy of Own Title
Halo Jones
V for Vendetta
D.R. and Quinch

Favourite Single or Continued Story
Halo Jones Book Two (2000 AD #406-415)
Midnight Surfer (Judge Dredd, 2000 AD #424-429)
DR and Quinch Get Back to Nature (2000 AD Summer Special)

Favourite New Comic
Captain Britain
The Best of 2000 AD
Swiftsure

Favourite Comic Cover
Captain Britain #6
Captain Britain #8
2000 AD #450

Favourite Specialist Comics Publication
Speakeasy
Fantasy Advertiser
Arkensword

AMERICAN SECTION

Favourite Artist (penciller) 
George Pérez
Art Adams
John Byrne

Favourite Artist (inker)
Terry Austin
John Totleben
Jerry Ordway

Favourite Writer
Alan Moore
Chris Claremont
Marv Wolfman

Favourite Comic Book
Swamp Thing
Crisis on Infinite Earths
X-Men

Favourite Graphic Novel
American Flagg!: Hard Times
She-Hulk
Raven Banner

Favourite Character
Batman
Wolverine
Swamp Thing

Favourite Group or Team
X-Men
Teen Titans
Fantastic Four

Favourite Villain
Anti-Monitor
The Joker
Kingpin

Favourite Supporting Character
John Constantine (Swamp Thing)
Abby Cable (Swamp Thing)
Raul the Cat (American Flagg!)

Character Most Worthy of Own Title
Wolverine
Longshot
Green Arrow

Favourite Single or Continued Story
Crisis on Infinite Earths #1-9
X-Men Annual #9/New Mutants Special #1
 "American Gothic" in Swamp Thing #37

Favourite New Comic Title
Miracleman
Crisis on Infinite Earths
Moonshadow

Favourite Comic Cover
Swamp Thing #34
Crisis on Infinite Earths #7
New Mutants Special #1

Favourite Specialist Comics Publication
Amazing Heroes
The Comics Journal
Comics Interview

Roll of Honour
Alan Moore
Dick Giordano
Frank Miller

1987
The 1986 results were presented on Saturday, September 5, 1987, at UKCAC87, The Institute of Education, London WC1. The winners were:

British Section
Favourite Artist: Alan Davis
Favourite Writer: Alan Moore
Favourite Comic: 2000 AD
Favourite Comic Album: D.R. and Quinch's Totally Awesome Guide to Life
Favourite Character: Judge Dredd
Favourite Villain: Torquemada
 (nominee): Zebethyial (Redfox)
Favourite Supporting Character: Ukko the Dwarf (from Sláine)
Character Most Worthy of Own Title: Captain Britain
 (nominee): Lyssa (Redfox)
Favourite Single or Continued Story: Halo Jones Book Three
Favourite New Comic: Redfox
Favourite Comic Cover: 2000 AD #500
Favourite Specialist Comics Publication: Speakeasy

American section
Favourite Artist (penciller): Frank Miller
Favourite Artist (inker): Terry Austin
Favourite Writer: Alan Moore
Favourite Comicbook: Watchmen
Favourite Graphic Novel: Batman: The Dark Knight Returns
Favourite Character: Batman
Favourite Group or Team: X-Men
Favourite Villain: The Joker
Favourite Supporting Character: John Constantine
Character Most Worthy of Own Title: Wolverine
Favourite Single or Continued Story: Batman: The Dark Knight Returns
Favourite New Comic Title: Watchmen
Favourite Comic Cover: Batman: The Dark Knight Returns #1
Favourite Specialist Comics Publication: Amazing Heroes

Roll of Honour
Frank Miller

1988
The Awards for comics released during 1987 were presented on Saturday, September 24, 1988, at UKCAC88, The Institute of Education, London WC1. The winners were:

British Section
Favourite Artist: Bryan Talbot
Favourite Writer: Pat Mills
Favourite Comic: 2000 AD
Favourite Comic Album: Violent Cases
Favourite Character: Luther Arkwright
Favourite Villain: Torquemada (Nemesis the Warlock)
Favourite Supporting Character: Ukko the Dwarf (Sláine)
Character Most Worthy of Own Title: Halo Jones
Favourite Single or Continued Story: Zenith (2000 AD #535-550)
Favourite New Comic: The Adventures of Luther Arkwright
Favourite Comic Cover: The Adventures of Luther Arkwright #1 (Bryan Talbot)
Favourite Specialist Comics Publication: Speakeasy

American Section
Favourite Artist (penciller): Bill Sienkiewicz
Favourite Artist (inker): Terry Austin
Favourite Writer: Alan Moore
Favourite Comicbook: Watchmen
Favourite Graphic Novel: Daredevil: Love and War
Favourite Character: Batman
Favourite Group or Team: Justice League International
Favourite Villain: The Joker
Favourite Supporting Character: Abigail Arcane Cable
Character Most Worthy of Own Title: Rorschach
Favourite Single or Continued Story: Batman #404-407: Year One
Favourite New Comic Title: Marshal Law
Favourite Comic Cover: Wonder Woman #10
Favourite Specialist Comics Publication: Amazing Heroes

Roll of Honour
Pat Mills

1990
The results for 1989 were presented at the 1990 United Kingdom Comic Art Convention (UKCAC) on September 23<ref name=TCJ139>"Eagle Awards Return," '"The Comics Journal #139 (Dec. 1990), p. 20.</ref> by Paul Gambaccini and Dave Gibbons. The winners were:

Roll of Honour: 2000 ADBest International Comic Book: Akira British Section 
Favourite Artist: Simon Bisley
Favourite Writer: Grant Morrison
Favourite Comic: 2000 ADFavourite Graphic Novel: Sláine: The Horned God Book IFavourite Character: Judge Dredd
Favourite Villain: Judge Death
Favourite Supporting Character: Middenface McNulty (Strontium Dog)
Favourite Single or Continued Story: Sláine: The Horned God Book I (2000 AD #626-635)
Favourite New Comic: The Bogie ManFavourite Comic Cover: 2000 AD Prog 626
Favourite Specialist Comics Publication: Speakeasy American Section 
Favourite Writer: Neil Gaiman, Sandman (DC)
Favourite Artist (Penciller): Todd McFarlane
Favourite Artist (Inker): Paul Neary
Favourite Comicbook: Uncanny X-MenFavourite Graphic Novel: Arkham Asylum: A Serious House on Serious EarthFavourite Character: Batman
Favourite Group or Team: Doom Patrol
Favourite Villain: The Joker
Character Most Worthy of Own Title: Captain Britain
Favourite Single or Continued Story: SkreemerFavourite New Comic Title: Batman: Legends of the Dark KnightFavourite Comic Cover: Aliens #1 by Denis Beauvais
Favourite Specialist Comics Publication: Marvel Age 2nd place: The Comics Journal1997

Best Newcomer: Alex Ronald

2000

British Section

Favourite British Comic
(Sponsored by Comic Book Postal Auctions)2000 ADThe BeanoJudge Dredd MegazineVizWarhammerFavourite Comic Strip in a UK Comic or MagazineJudge Dredd (2000 AD/Judge Dredd Megazine)Action Man (Action Man Monthly)Doctor Who (Doctor Who Magazine)Nikolai Dante (2000 AD)Sinister Dexter (2000 AD)

Favourite UK Non-newsstand Title
(Sponsored by Red Route)Kane, by Paul GristClass of '79O-MenSleaze CastleStrangehavenNorth American Section
The following award nominations cover creators and work published in the U.S. and Canada only (irrespective of the country of origin of the work or the nationality of its creators), with nominations based purely on work published in 1999:

Favourite Colour Comicbook
(Sponsored by Quality Comics)
1999: Preacher, by Garth Ennis and Steve DillonJLATransmetropolitanAcme Novelty LibraryAvengersFavourite Black & White Comicbook
(Sponsored by Page 45)Sin City: Hell & Back, by Frank MillerStrangers in ParadiseCerebusBoneTorsoFavourite New Comicbook of 1999
(Sponsored by Dynamic Forces)Top 10, by Alan Moore and Gene HaThe AuthorityHeart of EmpirePlanetaryRising StarsInternational Section

Favourite Comics Writer
Alan Moore
Kurt Busiek
Warren Ellis
Garth Ennis
Grant Morrison

Favourite Comics Artist (penciller)
George Pérez
Steve Dillon
Bryan Hitch
Frank Quitely
Bryan Talbot

Favourite Comic Book Artist (inker)
Jimmy Palmiotti
Terry Austin
Mark Farmer
Mick Gray
Paul Neary

Favourite Comics Artist (painted artwork)
Alex Ross
Dan Brereton
John Burns
Glenn Fabry
David Mack

Favourite Comics Artist (colouring)
Laura DePuy Martin
Matt Hollingsworth
Liquid!
Angus McKie
Lynn Varley

Favourite Comics Editor
Denny O'Neil
David Bishop
Tom Brevoort
Scott Dunbier
Bob Harras

Favourite Comic (excluding North American and UK titles)
(Sponsored by Knockabout Comics)Bacchus, by Eddie Campbell (Australia)Comix 2000 (France)Dylan Dog (Italy)Lapin (France)Pokémon (Japan)

Favourite Comics Character
(Sponsored by David's Comics)
Batman, created by Bob Kane
Cerebus, created by Dave Sim
Jesse Custer (Preacher), created by Garth Ennis and Steve Dillon
Spider Jerusalem (Transmetropolitan), created by Warren Ellis and Darick Robertson
Superman, created by Jerry Siegel and Joe Shuster

Favourite Comics Story (which appeared, began or ended during 1999)
(Sponsored by Quality Comics)Daredevil (#1-8), by Kevin Smith and Joe QuesadaNo Man's LandHeart of EmpireAvengers ForeverThe InhumansSam and Twitch (#1-7: Udaku)

Character Most Worthy of Own Ongoing Title
Luther Arkwright (Heart of Empire)
The Huntress (Batman)
Hal Jordan (Green Lantern)
Jenny Sparks (The Authority)
Storm (The X-Men)

Favourite Supporting Character
Oracle/Barbara Gordon (Batman/Birds of Prey)
Alfred Pennyworth (Batman)
Cassidy (Preacher)
Tulip O'Hare (Preacher)
Plastic Man (JLA)

Favourite Cover Published During 1999Batman: Harley Quinn by Alex RossBatman: War on Crime2000 AD Prog 2000Daredevil #9The Inhumans #11

Favourite Comics Villain
(Sponsored by B-Hive Ltd.)
Herr Starr (Preacher)
Doctor Doom (Fantastic Four)
Joker (Batman)
Lex Luthor (Superman)
Magneto (X-Men)

Favourite Graphic Novel
(Sponsored by Diamond Comic Distributors)JLA: Earth 2, by Grant Morrison and Frank QuitelySandman: The Dream HuntersBatman: War on CrimeGood-Bye, Chunky RiceYou Are HereFavourite Trade PaperbackFrom Hell: To Hell, by Alan Moore and Eddie CampbellBatman: The Long HalloweenCrisis on Infinite EarthsDaredevil: Visionaries300Favourite Newspaper Strip
(Sponsored by Gosh)PeanutsDilbertDoonesburyGarfieldLiberty MeadowsFavourite Comics Related Website (professional)
Comic Book Resources
Comicon.com
DC Comics.com
Jinxworld
Newsarama

Favourite Comics Related Website (fan-organized)
(Sponsored by eBay)
Sequential Tart
Twist and Shout Comics Online
Fanzing
x-fan.htm
Class of ‘79

Favourite Comics E-ZineAstounding Space Thrills, by Steve ConleyComic Book Net Electronic MagazineThe MatrixRustX-Flies: Flies in BlackFavourite Trade Publication
(Sponsored by East End Offset)WizardComic Book ArtistComics Buyer's GuideComics InternationalThe Comics JournalFavourite Comics-based Film or TV Series
(Sponsored by SFX magazine)Batman BeyondBig Guy and Rusty the Boy RobotMystery MenSpider-Man UnlimitedSuperman AdventuresRoll of Honour
(Sponsored by Cartoon Art Trust)
A lifetime achievement award.
Gil Kane

2002
Note: Voting ended in October 2001 and the winners were announced in June 2002, so news reports announced these variously as the 2001, or 2002 Eagle Awards.

British Section

Favourite British Comic2000 ADJudge Dredd MegazineWarhammer MonthlyFavourite Comic Strip to Appear in a UK Comic or MagazineNikolai Dante (2000 AD)Judge Dredd (2000 AD/Judge Dredd Megazine)NecronautsFavourite British Small Press TitleJack StaffBazooka JulesThe O-MenNorth American Section
The following award nominations cover creators and work published in the US and Canada only (irrespective of the country of origin of the work or the nationality of its creators), with nominations based purely on work published in 2000:

Favourite Colour ComicbookJSAPlanetaryStarmanFavourite Black & White ComicbookLiberty Meadows, by Frank ChoBone, by Jeff SmithStrangers in Paradise, by Terry Moore

Favourite New Comicbook of 2000Ultimate Spider-ManPowersUltimate X-MenInternational Section

Favourite Comics Writer
Alan Moore
Brian Michael Bendis
Warren Ellis

Favourite Comics Writer/Artist
Frank Miller
Brian Michael Bendis
David W. Mack

Favourite Comics Artist: Pencils
Frank Quitely
Michael Avon Oeming
George Pérez

Favourite Comic Book Artist:Inks
Mark Farmer
Paul Neary
Jimmy Palmiotti

Favourite Comics Artist:Fully Painted Artwork
Alex Ross
Glenn Fabry
David Mack

Favourite Colourist
Laura DePuy
Chris Blythe
Liquid!

Favourite Comics Editor
Andy Diggle (Mighty Tharg: 2000 AD)
Tom Brevoort
Joe Quesada

Favourite Manga ComicLone Wolf and CubAkiraBlade of the ImmortalFavourite European ComicMetabarons (France)The Extended Dream of Mr. D (Spain)Ratman (Italy)

Favourite Comics Character
Batman, created by Bob Kane
Judge Dredd
Spider-Man

Favourite Comics Story
(which appeared, began or ended during 2000)The Authority: The NativityStarman: Grand GuignolPowers: Who Killed Retro Girl?Character Most Worthy of Own Ongoing Title
Elijah Snow (Planetary)
Dr. Mid-Nite (JSA)
Harry Exton/Button Man (2000 AD)

Favourite Supporting Character in Comics
Commissioner James Gordon (Batman)
Alfred Pennyworth (Batman)
Uncle Ben (Ultimate Spider-Man)

Favourite Comics Cover Published During 2000Ultimate Spider-Man #1, by Joe Quesada100 Bullets #21, by Dave JohnsonThe Authority #14, by Frank Quitely

Favourite Comics Villain
Lex Luthor (Superman)
Doctor Doom (Fantastic Four)
The Joker (Batman)

Favourite Graphic NovelSafe Area Gorazde, by Joe SaccoPedro and Me, by Judd WinickTorso, by Brian Michael Bendis

Favourite Reprint CollectionThe Authority: Under New ManagementNo Man's Land, Volume 1Lone Wolf and CubFavourite Newspaper StripLiberty MeadowsDilbertZitsFavourite Magazine about ComicsWizardComics InternationalThe Comics JournalFavourite Comics-based BookThe Amazing Adventures of Kavalier and Clay, by Michael ChabonReinventing Comics, by Scott McCloudWonder Woman: The Complete History, by Les Daniels

Internet Section

Favourite Comics Related Website (professional)
Comic Book Resources
2000ADonline
Newsarama

Favourite Comics E-ZineComic Book Electronic MagazineFanzingSequential TartFavourite Web-based ComicSluggy FreelanceAstounding Space Thrills, by Steve ConleyZot!, by Scott McCloud

Roll of Honour
Joe Quesada
CrossGeneration Comics
Warren Ellis

2004
Presented at the inaugural Comic Expo, held November 6–7, at the Ramada City Inn in Bristol.

Favourite Colour ComicbookFantastic Four (Marvel Comics)PlanetaryThe UltimatesFavourite Black & White ComicbookBone (Cartoon Books)CerebusQueen & CountryFavourite New ComicbookConan (Dark Horse)Marvel 1602The LosersFavourite Comics Writer
J. Michael Straczynski
Brian Michael Bendis
Mark Millar

Favourite Comics Writer/Artist
Mike Mignola
Jeff Smith
Chris Ware

Favourite Comics Artist: Pencils
Jim Lee
John Cassaday
Andy Kubert

Favourite Comics Artist: Inks
Scott Williams
Jimmy Palmiotti
Kevin Nowlan

Favourite Comics Artist: Painted Art
Alex Ross
Gabriel del Otto
Glenn Fabry

Favourite Colourist
Laura DePuy Martin
Chris Blythe
Dave Stewart

Favourite Comics Editor
Axel Alonzo (Marvel Comics)
Tom Brevoort
Joey Cavalieri

Favourite Manga ComicBlade of the Immortal (Dark Horse)Battle RoyaleOh My GoddessFavourite European ComicTex (Sergio Bonelli Editore, Italy)Blacksad (Dargaud, France)El Vibora (Ediciones La Cúpula, Spain)

Favourite Comics Character
Batman (DC)
Hellboy
Jessica Jones (Alias)

Favourite Comics StoryDaredevil #46-50: Hardcore (Brian Michael Bendis & Alex Maleev)Conan: The Legend (#0; Kurt Busiek/Cary Nord)Gotham Central: Half a Life (#6-10; Greg Rucka/Michael Lark)

Character Most Worthy of Own Title
Doctor Strange (Marvel Comics)
Captain Britain
Marvelman/Miracleman

Favourite Supporting Character
Mary Jane Watson (Spider-Man – Marvel Comics)
Phoney Bone (Bone)
Doc Brass (Planetary)

Favourite Comics CoverJLA: Liberty and Justice (Alex Ross)Global Frequency #7 (Brian Wood)Hulk: Gray #1 (Tim Sale)

Favourite Comics Villain
Doctor Doom (Fantastic Four – Marvel Comics)
Hush (Batman)
The Icicle (JSA)

Favourite Graphic NovelSgt. Rock: Between Hell and a Hard Place (Brian Azzarello/Joe Kubert)Blankets (Craig Thompson)The Fixer (Joe Sacco)

Favourite Reprint CompilationThe Chronicles of Conan (Dark Horse)Absolute AuthorityThe Spirit ArchivesFavourite Newspaper StripMutts (Patrick McDonnell)Maakies (Tony Millionaire)Spooner (Ted Dawson)

Favourite Magazine About ComicsThe Comics Journal (Fantagraphics Books)Comic Book ArtistComics InternationalFavourite Comics-related BookMythology: The DC Comics Art of Alex Ross (Chip Kidd with Geoff Spear)The Art of Mike MignolaSandman: King of Dreams (Alisa Kwitney)

Favourite Comics-based Movie or TVX2 (Bryan Singer, director)American SplendorSmallvilleFavourite Comics-related MerchandiseKingdom Come action figures (DC Select; second series)
Doctor Doom Bust (Diamond Select)
HeroClix "Xplosion" set (WizKids)

Favourite British ComicWarhammer Monthly (Black Library)Judge Dredd MegazineStrikerFavourite Comic Strip to Appear in a UK Comic or MagazineJudge Dredd (2000 AD/Judge Dredd Megazine – Rebellion)Sid the Sexist (Viz)Bash Street Kids (The Beano)

Favourite British Small Press TitleThrud the Barbarian (Carl Critchlow)Jack StaffStrangehavenFavourite Comics-related Website
Comicon.com
Comic Book Resources
Silver Bullet Comic Books

Favourite Comics E-ZineNewsaramaThe PulseSequential TartFavourite Web-based ComicPvP (Scott Kurtz)Marc Hempel's Naked BrainMike SnartRoll of Honour
Neil Gaiman

2006
The results were announced on 13 May 2006 at the Comic Expo in Bristol.

Favourite Colour Comicbook - AmericanThe Ultimates Volume 2 (Marvel Comics)Ex Machina (DC/Wildstorm)JSA (DC)

Favourite Colour Comicbook - BritishJudge Dredd Megazine (Rebellion)Brodie's Law (Pulp Theatre Entertainment)Midnight Kiss (Markosia)

Favourite Black & White Comicbook - AmericanThe Walking Dead (Image Comics)Love and Rockets (Fantagraphics)Queen & Country (Image)

Favourite Black & White Comicbook - BritishSpringheeled Jack (Black Boar Press)Freak Show (Atomic Diner)Solar Wind (Solar Wind)

Favourite New ComicbookAll-Star Superman (DC) (Grant Morrison/Frank Quitely)Albion (Alan Moore/Leah Moore/John Reppion/Shane Oakley)Young Avengers (Allan Heinberg/Jim Cheung/John Dell)

Favourite Comics Writer
Grant Morrison
Geoff Johns
Brian K. Vaughan

Favourite Comics Writer/Artist
Howard Chaykin
Bryan Lee O'Malley
Eric Powell

Favourite Comics Artist: Pencils
Bryan Hitch
Alan Davis
Leinil Francis Yu

Favourite Comics Artist: Inks
Jimmy Palmiotti
Mark Farmer
Ande Parks

Favourite Comics Artist: Fully Painted Artwork
Alex Ross
David W. Mack
Kent Williams

Favourite Colourist
Laura DePuy Martin
Chris Blythe
Dave Stewart

Favourite Letterer
Todd Klein
Chris Eliopoulos
Richard Starkings/Comicraft

Favourite Comics Editor
Axel Alonso
Shelly Bond
Peter Tomasi

Favourite Publisher
DC Comics
IDW Publishing
Marvel Comics

Favourite MangaBlade of the Immortal (Dark Horse)Cromartie High School (Elji Nonaka)Shonen Jump (Various)

Favourite European ComicAsterix and the Falling Sky (Albert Rene Editions, France)Olympus (Humanoids Publishing, France)XIII (Dargaud, France)

Favourite Comics CharacterBatmanHellboyJudge DreddFavourite Comics Villain
Joker
Doctor Doom
Doctor Light

Favourite Comics StoryThe Ultimates volume 2 #1-9 (Mark Millar, Bryan Hitch and Paul Neary)The OMAC Project #1-6 (Rucka/Sai)Wolverine #20-25 (Mark Millar/John Romita Jr./Klaus Janson)

Favourite Comics CoverAll-Star Superman #1 (Frank Quitely)The Amazing Adventures of the Escapist #7 (Brian Bolland)The Ultimates Volume 2#2 (Bryan Hitch)

Favourite Original Graphic NovelTop 10: The Forty-Niners (Alan Moore and Gene Ha)The Quitter (Harvey Pekar and Dean Haspiel)Scott Pilgrim vs. the World (Bryan Lee O’Malley)

Favourite Reprint CompilationAbsolute Watchmen (Alan Moore and Dave Gibbons)Charley's War (Pat Mills and Joe Colquhoun)Negative Burn: The Very Best of 1993–1998 (Various)

Favourite Magazine About ComicsThe Comics Journal (Fantagraphics Books)Comic Book Artist (Top Shelf)Comics International (Quality Communications)

Favourite Comics-Related BookEisner/Miller (edited by Charles Brownstein & Diana Schutz)Foul Play: The Art and Artists of the Notorious 1950s EC Comics (Grant Geissman)Will Eisner: A Spirited Life (Bob Andelman)

Favourite Comics-based Movie or TVBatman Begins (Christopher Nolan, director)A History of Violence (David Cronenberg, director)Sin City (Robert Rodriguez/Frank Miller, director)

Favourite Comics-related Website
Silver Bullet Comic Books
Comic Book Resources
Newsarama

Favourite Web-based ComicSupernatural Law (www.webcomicsnation.com/supernaturallaw)Ctrl+Alt+Del (www.cad-comic.com)Questionable Content (www.questionablecontent.net)

Roll of Honour
Grant Morrison
Howard Chaykin
Alex Toth

Eagle Awards 30th Anniversary Award for Outstanding Achievements in British Comics
John M. Burns

2007
Nominations were made by the general comics-reading public via the Eagle Awards website, with the five most popular becoming nominees for the awards. The awards ceremony was held on Saturday, May 12, 2007, at the 2007 Bristol Comic Expo and was hosted by Norman Lovett.

Favourite Colour Comicbook - AmericanAll-Star SupermanDesolation JonesFablesJack StaffTransformersFavourite Colour Comicbook - British2000 ADJudge Dredd MegazineStarship TroopersEvent HorizonThrud the BarbarianFavourite Black & White Comicbook - AmericanThe Walking DeadCasanovaPhonogramUsagi YojimboWastelandFavourite Black & White Comicbook - BritishHero KillersHow to Date a Girl in Ten DaysMalcolm MagicFutureQuakeTales from the FlatFavourite New ComicbookNextwave52Civil WarJustice Society of AmericaTestamentFavourite Comics Writer
Warren Ellis
Brian K Vaughan
Ed Brubaker
Alan Moore
Grant Morrison

Favourite Comics Writer/Artist
Mike Mignola
Alan Davis
Ben Templesmith
Darwyn Cooke
Michael Avon Oeming

Favourite Comics Artist: Pencils
John Cassaday
Frank Quitely
Bryan Hitch
Alex Maleev
Frank Cho

Favourite Comics Artist: Inks
Paul Neary
Ande Parks
Danny Miki
Jimmy Palmiotti
Mark Farmer

Favourite Comics Artist: Fully Painted Artwork
Alex Ross
Alex Maleev
Ashley Wood
Ben Templesmith
James Jean

Favourite Colourist
Laura Martin
Dave Stewart
Alex Sinclair
Chris Blythe
Richard Isanove

Favourite Letterer
Chris Eliopoulos
Comiccraft
Richard Starkings
Todd Klein
Tom Frame

Favourite Editor
Matt Smith
Axel Alonso
Tom Brevoort
Steve Wacker

Favourite Publisher
Marvel Comics
Dark Horse Comics
DC Comics
Image Comics
Rebellion Developments

Favourite MangaBlade of the ImmortalDeath NoteNarutoPriestBattle RoyaleFavourite European ComicAsterix and the VikingsThe KillerXIIISanchoBlacksad: Red SoulFavourite Comics Character
Batman
Captain America
Daredevil
Judge Dredd
Spider-Man

Favourite Comics Villain
Dirk Anger (Nextwave: Marvel Comics|)
Joker (Batman family: DC)
Lex Luthor (Superman family: DC)
Black Adam (Infinite Crisis/JSA: DC)
Iron Man (Civil War: Marvel)

Favourite Comics Story Published During 2006Nextwave #1-6All-Star SupermanCivil War #1 upDaredevil #82-87 The Devil in Cell Block D52 #1 up

Favourite Comics Cover Published During 2006Fables: 1001 Nights of Snowfall (James Jean)Civil War #1 (Steve McNiven)The Ultimates 2 #12 (Bryan Hitch)Nextwave #11 (Stuart Immonen)52 #1 (J.G. Jones)Justice League of America #1 (Ed Benes)

Favourite Original Graphic NovelPride of BaghdadStagger LeeFables: 1001 Nights of SnowfallThe Five Fists of ScienceLost GirlsFavourite Reprint CompilationAbsolute Sandman v1Captain America: Winter Soldier v1Absolute Dark KnightAbsolute DC: The New FrontierAbsolute Kingdom ComeFavourite Magazine About ComicsWizardAlter EgoBack Issue!Comics InternationalThe Comics JournalFavourite Comics-related BookMaking Comics: Storytelling Secrets of Comics, Manga and Graphic Novels (Scott McCloud; HarperCollins)George Pérez: Story Teller (Dynamite)Great British Comics (Paul Gravett and Peter Stanbury; Aurum Press)The Art of Brian Bolland (Image/Desperado)Writing For Comics With Peter David (Impact Books)

Favourite Comics-based Movie or TVHeroesJustice League UnlimitedSuperman ReturnsHellboy AnimatedV for VendettaFavourite Comics-related Website
Newsarama
Comic Book Resources
Manga Life
Millarworld
Silver Bullet Comic Books

Favourite Web-based ComicPenny ArcadeDrastic ComicsSonic the Comic OnlinePvPDreamland ChroniclesRoll of Honour
Warren Ellis
Alex Toth
Brian K. Vaughan
Brian Michael Bendis
Tom Frame

2008
The ceremony was held on Saturday May 10, 2008, at the Bristol Comic Expo, and the awards were presented by comedian Fraser Ayres.

Award for Favourite Newcomer Writer
Matt Fraction
Jason Aaron
Nick Tapalansky
Simon Spurrier
Tony Lee

Award for Favourite Newcomer Artist
David Aja
Azim Akberali
Cliff Chiang
Declan Shalvey
Mahmud A. Asrar

Award for Favourite Comics Writer
Alan Moore
Brian K. Vaughan
Brian Michael Bendis
Ed Brubaker
Warren Ellis

Award for Favourite Comics Writer/Artist
Alan Davis
Bob Byrne
Bryan Talbot
Darwyn Cooke
Eric Powell

Award for Favourite Comics Artist: Pencils
Frank Cho
Bryan Hitch
Ethan Van Sciver
Frank Quitely
Thomas Boatwright

Award for Favourite Comics Artist: Inks
D'Israeli (Matt Brooker)
Ande Parks
Frank Quitely
Gary Erskine
Thomas Boatwright

Award for Favourite Artist: Painted Artwork
Alex Ross
Ashley Wood
Azim Akberali
Ben Templesmith
Marko Djurdjevic

Award for Favourite Colourist
Laura Martin
D'Israeli (Matt Brooker)
Dave Stewart
Matt Hollingsworth
Richard Isanove

Award for Favourite Letterer
Dave Gibbons
Chris Eliopoulos
Richard Starkings
Thomas Mauer
Todd Klein

Award for Favourite Editor
Tharg (Matt Smith)
Axel Alonso
Chris Ryall
Kris Simon
Tom Brevoort

Award for Favourite Publisher
Marvel Comics
Dark Horse Comics
DC Comics
Image
Vertigo

Award for Favourite Colour Comicbook - AmericanHellboy: Darkness CallsAll-Star SupermanAwakeningCaptain AmericaY: The Last ManAward for Favourite Colour Comicbook - BritishSpectacular Spider-Man2000 ADHope FallsJudge Dredd MegazineStarship TroopersAward for Favourite Black and White Comicbook - AmericanThe Walking DeadLocalPhonogramUsagi YojimboWastelandAward for Favourite Black and White Comicbook - BritishHow to Date a Girl in Ten DaysBiomechaEleventh HourFutureQuakeTales from the FlatWalking WoundedAward for Favourite New ComicbookThorAwakeningDan DareHope FallsImmortal Iron FistThe Umbrella AcademyAward for Favourite MangaDeath NoteBlade of the ImmortalBleachDragon Ball ZNarutoAward for Favourite European ComicsRequiem, Vampire KnightBlacksadDylan DogSanchoThe KillerAward for Favourite Comics Story published during 2007Captain America 25-30: The Death of Captain AmericaCriminal 6-10: LawlessGreen Lantern: Sinestro Corps WarHellboy: Darkness CallsY: The Last Man 55-60

Award for Favourite Comics Cover published during 2007World War Hulk 1A (David Finch)Fables 66 (James Jean)Immortal Iron Fist 4 (David Aja)Northlanders 1B (Adam Kubert)The Umbrella Academy 1 (James Jean)

Award for Favourite Original Graphic NovelThe League of Extraordinary Gentlemen: Black DossierAlice in SunderlandThe Goon: ChinatownThe Order of the Stick: Start of DarknessThe Surreal Adventures of Edgar Allan PooAward for Favourite Reprint CompilationAbsolute Sandman Volume 2Criminal 1: CowardDynamo 5 Vol 1Immortal Iron Fist: The Last Iron Fist StoryStrontium Dog Search/Destroy Agency Files 03

Award for Favourite Comics Hero
Batman
Dan Dare
Hellboy
Judge Dredd
Spider-Man

Award for Favourite Comics Villain
Joker
Doctor Doom
Harley Quinn
Iron Man
Sinestro

Award for Favourite Magazine About ComicsWizardBack Issue!Comics InternationalDraw!The Comics JournalWrite Now!Award for Favourite Comics-Related BookOur Gods Wear SpandexPulphope: The Art of Paul PopeReading Comics: How Graphic Novels Work and What They MeanThrill Power OverloadUno Tarino: The Latest Art of Ashley WoodAward for Favourite Comics-Based Movie Or TV30030 Days of NightHeroesSpider-Man 3StardustAward for Favourite Comics Related Website
Marvel.com
2000ADonline
Comic Book Resources
Jinxworld
Newsarama

Award for Favourite Web-Based ComicThe Order of the StickGirl GeniusPenny ArcadePvPThe Adventures of Dr. McNinjaAward for Roll of Honour
Mike Mignola
Bill Sienkiewicz
Brian Bolland
Brian K. Vaughan
Mike Wieringo

2010
The 2009 vote was skipped but the 2010 awards (for work done in 2009) were presented at the London MCM Expo in a gala held at ExCeL London on 29 October 2009.

Favourite Newcomer Writer
Jonathan Hickman
Al Ewing
Kathryn Immonen
Kieron Gillen
Mike Lynch

Favourite Newcomer Artist
Jamie McKelvie
David Lafuente
Declan Shalvey
John Cullen
Matt Timson

Favourite Writer
Warren Ellis
Alan Moore
Geoff Johns
John Wagner
Tony Lee

Favourite Writer/Artist
Darwyn Cooke
Bryan Lee O'Malley
David Mazzucchelli
John Byrne
Paul Grist

Favourite Artist: Pencils
Frank Quitely
Guy Davis
Ivan Reis
J. H. Williams III
Stuart Immonen

Favourite Artist: Inks
Kevin O'Neill
Butch Guice
Charlie Adlard
Gary Erskine
Mark Farmer

Favourite Artist: Painted Artwork
J. H. Williams III
Adi Granov
Alex Ross
Ben Templesmith
James Jean

Favourite Colourist
Ben Templesmith
Christina Strain
Dave Stewart
Laura Martin
Len O'Grady

Favourite Letterer
Todd Klein
Annie Parkhouse
Chris Eliopoulos
Nate Piekos
Richard Starkings
Simon Bowland

Favourite Editor
Axel Alonso
Matt Smith
Nick Lowe
Stephen Wacker
Tom Brevoort

Favourite Publisher
DC Comics/Vertigo
IDW Publishing
Image Comics
Marvel Comics
Rebellion Developments (2000 AD)

Favourite American Colour ComicbookBatman and RobinB.P.R.D.Captain Britain and MI13ChewDoctor Who (IDW)Phonogram: The Singles ClubScalpedFavourite British Colour Comicbook2000 ADSpandexThe BeanoThe Dead: Kingdom of FliesThe DFCFavourite American Black and White ComicbookThe Walking DeadI Kill GiantsScott PilgrimThe Venger: Dead Man RisingUsagi YojimboFavourite British Black and White ComicbookWhatever Happened to The World's Fastest Man?Chloe NoonanDragon HeirFutureQuakeSpace Babe 113Favourite New ComicbookBatman and RobinChewDoctor WhoRí RáThe UnwrittenFavourite MangaFullmetal AlchemistGoGo MonsterKurosagi Corpse Delivery ServicePlutoReyaFavourite European ComicbookRequiem Chevalier VampireChimpanzee ComplexLargo WinchL'Histoire SecreteRí RáFavourite Single Story Published During 2009Phonogram: The Singles Club #4: "Konichiwa Bitches"Doctor Who: "The Time Machination"Doctor Who: "Black Death White Life"From the Pages of Bram Stoker's Dracula: HarkerR.E.B.E.L.S. Annual #1: "Starro the Conqueror"

Favourite Continued Story Published During 2009The Walking Dead #61-65: "Fear The Hunters"Doctor Who: The ForgottenJudge Dredd: "Tour of Duty"Phonogram: The Singles ClubScalped #19-24: "The Gravel in your Gut"

Favourite Cover Published During 2009Batman and Robin #4 (Frank Quitely)2000 AD #1631 (D'Israeli featuring Dirty Frank)Batgirl #2 (Phil Noto)Batman and Robin #3 (Frank Quitely)Doctor Who: The Forgotten #6 (Ben Templesmith)

Favourite Original Graphic Novel Published During 2009The League of Extraordinary Gentlemen, Volume III: CenturyAsterios PolypGrandvilleMouse Guard: Winter 1152The HunterFavourite Reprint CompilationCaptain Britain by Alan Moore and Alan Davis OmnibusCharley's War: Underground and Over The TopDoctor Who: The ForgottenSaga of the Swamp ThingThe Rocketeer: The Complete AdventuresFavourite Magazine about ComicsWizardBack Issue!Comics InternationalThe Comics JournalTripwireFavourite Comics-Related BookThe Insider's Guide to Creating Comics and Graphic Novels by Andy SchmidtComic Book Design by Gary MillidgePeter and Max: A Fables Novel by Bill WillinghamThe Marvel Art of Marko DjurdjevicWar Stories by Mike Conroy

Favourite Comics-Related Movie or TV ShowWatchmenHeroesSmallvilleSurrogatesThe Big Bang TheoryFavourite Comics Related Website
Comic Book Resources
2000adonline
Bleeding Cool
Forbidden Planet Blog
Newsarama

Favourite Web-Based ComicFreakAngelsThe Order of the StickPvPSin TituloxkcdRoll of Honour
Brian Bolland
Dick Giordano
Joe Kubert
John Hicklenton
Peter David

2011
The awards for work in 2010 on 27 May 2011 and was presented by Billy West.

 Favourite Newcomer Writer 
 Paul Cornell
 Bryan Lee O'Malley
 Nick Spencer
 Al Ewing
 Scott Snyder

 Favourite Newcomer Artist 
 Sara Pichelli
 Rafael Albuquerque
 Fiona Staples
 Sean Murphy
 Bryan Lee O'Malley

 Favourite Writer 
 Grant Morrison
 Ed Brubaker
 Robert Kirkman
 Warren Ellis
 John Wagner

 Favourite Writer/Artist 
 Mike Mignola
 Gabriel Ba (with co-author Fabio Moon)
 Darwyn Cooke
 Jeff Lemire

 Favourite Artist: Pencils 
 J. H. Williams III
 Mike Mignola
 Dave Ryan
 Carlos Ezquerra
 Becky Cloonan

 Favourite Artist: Inks 
 Mike Mignola
 Carlos Ezquerra
 Gary Erskine
 Becky Cloonan
 Bill Sienkiewicz

 Favourite Artist: Painted Artwork 
 J. H. Williams III
 Ben Templesmith
 D'Israeli
 Alex Ross
 Jock

 Favourite Colourist 
 Dave Stewart
 Jeff Balke
 Len O'Grady
 Laura Martin
 Laura Allred

 Favourite Letterer 
 Richard Starkings
 Annie Parkhouse
 Rus Wooton
 Jim Campbell
 Chris Eliopoulos

 Favourite Editor 
 Matt Smith/Tharg
 Scott Allie
 Tom Brevoort
 Steve Wacker
 Todd McFarlane

 Favourite Publisher 
DC Comics/Vertigo/WildStorm
 Dark Horse Comics
 Image Comics/Top Cow
 IDW Publishing
 Marvel Comics

 Favourite American Comicbook: Colour 
 Batman and Robin Doctor Who Amazing Spider-Man Buffy the Vampire Slayer Season Eight Hellboy Favourite American Comicbook: Black and White 
 The Walking Dead Echo Age of Bronze Demo Volume 2 RASL Favourite British Comicbook: Colour 
 2000 AD Doctor Who Magazine The Man of Glass Torchwood Dandy Favourite British Comicbook: Black and White 
 Commando Zarjaz Dogbreath FutureQuake Paragon Favourite New Comicbook 
 Daytripper S.H.I.E.L.D Alan Moore's Neonomicon War of the Independents American Vampire Favourite Manga 
 Fullmetal Alchemist One Piece Berserk Bleach Naruto Favourite European Comicbook 
 Blacksad The Scorpion L’Histoire Secrete Sky Doll Requiem Vampire Knight Favourite Web-Based Comic 
 Axe Cop FreakAngels xkcd Hark! A Vagrant! Questionable Content Favourite Single Story 
 Daytripper #8
 Legends: The Enchanted #0
 A Cat Named Haiku Sea Bear and Grizzly Shark Amazing Spider-Man #625: "Endanger Species"

 Favourite Continued Story 
 The Walking Dead #73-79: "Too Far Gone"
 Hellboy #47-49: "The Storm"
 Fables #94-98: "Rose Red"
 Invincible #71-ongoing: "The Viltrumite War"
 2000 AD #1650-1693: Judge Dredd: "Tour of Duty"

 Favourite 2010 Cover 
 Batwoman #0 by J.H. Williams III
 Daytripper #2 by Gabriel Ba
 2000 AD #1700 by Jonathan Davis Hunt
 War of the Independents by Dave Ryan
 Axe Cop, Volume 1 by Ethan Nicolle

 Favourite 2010 Original Graphic Novel 
 Scott Pilgrim, Volume 6: Scott Pilgrim's Finest Hour Richard Stark's Parker: The Outfit Superman: Earth One Hellblazer: Pandemonium At The Mountains of Madness Favourite Reprint Compilation 
 Absolute All Star Superman Charley's War: Great Mutiny Batwoman: Elegy The Walking Dead, Volume 13 Doctor Who: Fugitive Favourite Comics-Related Book 
 75 Years of DC Comics (by Paul Levitz, Taschen)
 Icons: The DC Comics and Wildstorm Art of Jim Lee (Titan Books)
 The Horror, The Horror: Comic Books The Government Didn't Want You To Read (Harry N. Abrams, Inc.)
 Mega-City One Archives (Mongoose Publishing)
 Cover Run: The DC Comic Art of Adam Hughes (DC Comics)

 Favourite Comics-Related Movie or TV Show 
 Scott Pilgrim vs. the World Kick Ass The Big Bang Theory The Walking Dead Iron Man 2 Favourite Comics-Related Website 
 Comic Book Resources
 Newsarama
 ComicsAlliance
 Comic Attack
 Bleeding Cool
 Girls Read Comics Too

 Favourite Magazine about Comics 
 Wizard Back Issue! Alter Ego Tripwire Comic Heroes Roll of Honour 
 Dave Gibbons
 Bryan Lee O'Malley
 John Byrne
 Carlos Ezquerra
 David Mazzucchelli

2012
The 2012 Eagle Awards were announced on 25 May 2012.

Favourite Newcomer Writer
Jeff Lemire
J. H. Williams III
Michael Carroll
Nathan Edmondson
Robert Curley

Favourite Newcomer Artist
Francesco Francavilla
Axel Medellin
Declan Shalvey
Emanuela Lupacchino
Mahmud Asrar

Favourite Writer
Scott Snyder
Alan Moore
Ed Brubaker
Geoff Johns
Grant Morrison

Favourite Writer/Artist
Frank Miller
Darwyn Cooke
Francis Manapul
J. H. Williams III
Jeff Lemire

Favourite Artist: Pencils
J. H. Williams III
Becky Cloonan
Chris Bachalo
Ivan Reis
Jim Lee

Favourite Artist: Inks
Scott Williams
Becky Cloonan
Chris Samnee
D'Israeli
Gary Erskine

Favourite Artist: Fully Painted Artwork
Alex Ross
Adi Granov
Esad Ribić
J. H. Williams III
Sean Phillips

Favourite Colourist
Dave Stewart
Jamie Grant
Jeff Balke
Laura Martin
Rod Reis

Favourite Letterer
Richard Starkings/Comicraft
Annie Parkhouse
Chris Eliopoulos
Ed Dukeshire
Todd Klein

Favourite Editor
Karen Berger
Chris Ryall
Matt Smith
Steve Wacker
Tom Brevoort

Favourite Publisher
DC Comics/Vertigo
Dark Horse Comics
IDW Publishing
Image Comics
Marvel Comics

Favourite American Comicbook: ColourBatmanAquamanBatwomanDaredevilHellboyFavourite American Comicbook: Black and WhiteThe Walking DeadEchoesRASLUsagi YojimboWolvesFavourite British Comicbook: ColourDoctor Who Magazine2000 ADCLiNTJudge Dredd MegazineSTRIP MagazineFavourite British Comicbook: Black and WhiteVizBlood BlokesCommandoFuturequakeLou ScannonZarjazFavourite New ComicbookBatmanAnimal ManAquamanDaredevilWolverine and the X-MenFavourite Manga20th Century BoysBlade of the ImmortalBleachNarutoOne PieceFavourite European ComicbookDylan DogBetelgeuseJennifer WildeLeague of VolunteersRequiem Vampire KnightFavourite Web-Based ComicFreakangelsAce KilroyAxe CopHark! A Vagrantxkcd.comFavourite Single Story
Doctor Who (IDW) #12The Amazing Spider-Man #655Animal Man #1Aquaman #4Daredevil #7

Favourite Continued StoryWalking Dead: "No Way Out"American Vampire: "Ghost War"Batwoman: "Hydrology"Chew: "Flambe"Detective Comics: "The Black Mirror"

Favourite 2011 CoverBatwoman #1 by J.H. Williams III2000 AD #1752 by D'Israeli (featuring Dirty Frank)Aquaman #1 by Ivan ReisDaredevil #1 by Paolo RiveraDetective Comics #880 by Jock

Favourite 2011 Original Graphic NovelBatman: NoëlHabibiHellboy: House of the Living DeadLeague of Extraordinary Gentlemen: Century: 1969New Teen Titans: GamesFavourite Reprint CompilationThor Omnibus by Walt SimonsonAquaman: Death of A PrinceDetective Comics: The Black MirrorWalking Dead, Volume 15We3 Deluxe EditionFavourite Comics-Related BookSupergods: Our World in the Age of the Superhero1001 Comics You Must Read Before You DieAlan Moore: StorytellerThe Batman FilesThe Marvel Art of John Romita, Jr.Favourite Comics-Related Movie or TV ShowThe Big Bang TheoryCaptain America: The First AvengerMisfitsWalking DeadX-Men: First ClassFavourite Comics-Related Website
Bleeding Cool
Comic Book Resources
ComicsAlliance
Newsarama
Zona Negativa

Favourite Magazine about ComicsDC Comics Superhero CollectionAlter EgoBack Issue!Comic HeroesComics JournalRoll of Honour
Frank Quitely
Adam Hughes
Brian Michael Bendis
Darwyn Cooke
Geoff Johns

 2014 
The Eagle Awards returned one last time, renamed as The True Believers Comics Award but keeping essentially the same format as in the past. They were presented at the London Film and Comic Con (with Anthony Stewart Head hosting) on July 12, 2014.

Favourite Rising Star: Writer
Matt Fraction
Al Ewing
Charles Soule
Katie Cook
Scott Snyder

Favourite Rising Star: Artist
Fiona Staples
Annie Wu
Declan Shalvey
Katie Cook
Sean Murphy

Favourite Writer
Matt Fraction
Alan Moore
James Roberts
Kelly Sue DeConnick
Scott Snyder

Favourite Artist: Pencils
Fiona Staples
Becky Cloonan
David Aja
Greg Capullo
J.H. Williams

Favourite Artist: Inks
Becky Cloonan
Bill Sienkiewicz
Brian Bolland
David Aja
J.H. Williams III

Favourite Artist: Fully-Painted Art
Fiona Staples
Adi Granov
Alex Ross
Francesco Francavilla
J.H. Williams III

Favourite Colourist
Matt Hollingsworth
Francesco Francavilla
Jordie Bellaire
Laura Allred
Laura Martin

Favourite Letterer
Annie Parkhouse
Comicraft
Jim Campbell
Terry Moore
Todd Klein

Favourite Editor
Chris Ryall
Matt Smith
Nick Lowe
Scott Allie
Stephen Wacker

Favourite American Comicbook: ColourSagaBatmanHawkeyeSex CriminalsTransformers: More than Meets the EyeFavourite British Comic: Colour2000 ADDeath SentenceDungeon FunPorcelain: A Gothic Fairy TaleSaltire InvasionFavourite American Comicbook: Black and WhiteThe Walking DeadBatman Black and WhitePunk Rock JesusRachel RisingSatellite Sam Favourite British Comic: Black and White Good Cop Bad Cop by Jim AlexanderDexter's Half DozenFuturequakeSchool of BitchesWolf CountryFavourite New Comics Title: Ongoing or Mini-SeriesGuardians of the GalaxyEast of WestPretty DeadlyRat QueensSex CriminalsThe WakeFavourite European ComicbookAsterix and the PictsAmorasCeltic Warrior: The Legend of Cú ChulainnFinn & FishOrfaniFavourite MangaAttack on TitanBleachNarutoOne PieceYotsuba&!Favourite Original Graphic NovelAvengers: Endless WartimeBattling BoyNemo: Heart of IceRichard Stark's Parker: SlaygroundThe Fifth Beatle: The Brian Epstein StoryThe Unwritten: Tommy Taylor and the Ship That Sank TwiceFavourite Reprint CompilationHawkeye Volume 1 Oversized H/CCaptain America: The Winter SoldierJeff Smith's Bone's The Great Cow Race: Artist's EditionThe Joker: The Clown Prince of CrimeZenithFavourite Single Story
"Pizza is my Business," Hawkeye #11
"Cybertronian Homesick Blues", Transformers: More Than Meets the Eye #13
"Kingdoms Fall" Infinity #3
"The End" Locke & Key: Alpha #2Afterlife with Archie #1

Favourite Continued StorySagaBatman #21 on – "Zero Year"Fables #125-129 – "Snow White"The Walking Dead #115 on – "All Out War"Transformers: More Than Meets the Eye #17-21 – "Remain in Light"

Favourite 2013 CoverHawkeye #9 (David Aja)Fables #134
Pretty Deadly #1
Rat Queens #1
Sex Criminals #1

Favourite PublisherIDW PublishingDC Comics
Image
Marvel
Rebellion

Favourite Web-Based ComicAces Weekly – www.acesweekly.co.ukDumbing of Age – www.dumbingofage.com
JL8: A Webcomic – www.jl8comic.tumblr.com
Oglaf – www.oglaf.com
XKCD – www.xkcd.com

Favourite Magazine (Print Periodical) about Comics
Bleeding Cool
Back Issue
Comic Heroes
Judge Dredd Megazine
The Comics Journal

Favourite Comics-Related BookThe Secret History of Marvel Comics: Jack Kirby and the Moonlighting Artists at Martin Goodman's Empire by Blake Bell and Michael J. Vassallo 
Genius, Illustrated: The Life and Time of Alex Toth
Magic Words: The Extraordinary Life of Alan Moore
The DC Comics Guide to Creating Comics: Inside the Art of Visual Storytelling
The Fables Encyclopaedia

Favourite Comic Related Movie or TV ShowIron Man 3Agents of S.H.I.E.L.D.ArrowThe Walking DeadThor: The Dark WorldFavourite Comics-Related Website
Comic Book Resources – www.comicbookresources.com2000 AD'' Online – www.2000adonline.com
Bleeding Cool – www.bleedingcool.com
ComicsAlliance – www.comicsalliance.com
The Mary Sue – www.themarysue.com

Roll of Honour
Gail Simone
Jean Giraud (Moebius)
Jim Lee
Karen Berger
Walter Simonson

Notes

References

Citations

Sources 
List of all winners, 1977–2011 at the official Eagle Awards website, archived at The Wayback Machine
List of 2004's winners at Comicsbulletin.com
Comic Book Awards Almanac Eagle Comics page

Comics award winners
Lists of award winners
Comics-related lists